Jannat is a 2018 Bangladeshi crime and drama  film. The film story by Sudipto Saeed Khan and directed by Mostafizur Rahman Manik. It features Symon Sadik, Mahiya Mahi, Ali Raj and Misha Sawdagor. The film was released worldwide on 22 August 2018. The film won five awards including Best Director and Best Actor at the 43rd Bangladesh National Film Awards.

Cast
 Symon Sadik as Aslam / Iftikhar
 Mahiya Mahi as Jannat
 Ali Raj as Noor Muhammad
 Misha Showdagor as Pir baba
 Maruf Aqib
 Labonno Lisa
 Rahana Joly
 Sofiya Ahmed Lina
 Shimul Khan
 Chikon Ali
 Raha Tanha Khan

Release 

Jannat received approval from the Bangladesh Film Censor Board in the last week of March 2018 without cuts. It released in Bangladesh on 23 screens on 22 August 2018 during the Eid al-Adha holiday. According to newspapers The Daily Star and New Age, it did not do well at the box office.

One theater, the Sangeeta Cinema Hall in Satkhira, withdrew the film at the direction of police, after a complaint from the Imam Association Satkhira saying that Jannat might "hurt the religious sentiments of the people".

Awards

References

External links
 

2018 films
Bengali-language Bangladeshi films
Best Film National Film Award (Bangladesh) winners
2010s Bengali-language films